The  is a river located on the southeast side of the island of Iriomote, one of the Yaeyama Islands of Japan.

External links
Nakama River Conservation District, Iriomote-jima, Okinawa Information

Rivers of Okinawa Prefecture
Rivers of Japan